Patrick Blennerhassett is a Canadian journalist and author who currently lives in Hong Kong.

Early life and education
Blennerhassett was born in Vancouver, and raised in Kamloops, British Columbia. He is a Thompson Rivers University graduate, who also attended Langara College and Simon Fraser University. His work has been published in such outlets as The Guardian and The Globe & Mail.

Blennerhassett has published four novels. He is also a freelance journalist and regularly contributes articles to Business in Vancouver.

In 2007 Blennerhassett was the recipient of a Jack Webster Foundation Fellowship Award.

In 2016 Blennerhassett published a non-fiction book about Olympic field hockey player Balbir Singh Sr.

Blennerhassett currently works for the South China Morning Post in Hong Kong. in 2018 he wrote a feature article for The Guardian about a rash of deaths of men in his hometown of Kamloops.

Books
Monument
Random Acts of Vandalism
A Forgotten Legend: Balbir Singh Sr., Triple Olympic Gold & Modi's New India
The Fatalists

References 

1982 births
Living people
21st-century Canadian novelists
Canadian male novelists
Canadian male journalists
Writers from Vancouver
20th-century Canadian novelists
20th-century Canadian male writers
21st-century Canadian male writers
Langara College people